Suyutkino is a rural locality (a selo) in Kraynovsky Selsoviet, Kizlyarsky District, Republic of Dagestan, Russia. The population was 98 as of 2010. There is 1 street.

Geography 
It is located 62 km northeast of Kizlyar, 27 km northwest of Kraynovka.

Nationalities 
Avars, Dargins and Russians live there.

References 

Rural localities in Kizlyarsky District